Shirakiacris is an Asian genus of grasshoppers in the subfamily Eyprepocnemidinae and the tribe Eyprepocnemidini.  Its recorded distribution includes: southern and eastern China, Korea, Japan and Vietnam.

Species
The Orthoptera Species File lists:
Shirakiacris brachyptera Zheng, 1983
Shirakiacris shirakii (Bolívar, 1914) - type species (as "Euprepocnemis shirakii")
Shirakiacris tenuistris Huang, 1988
Shirakiacris yukweiensis (Chang, 1937)

References

External links 

Acrididae genera
Orthoptera of Indo-China
Orthoptera of Asia